Jalgyz-Terek is a village in the Naryn Region of Kyrgyzstan. Its population was 1,245 in 2021.

References 

 

Populated places in Naryn Region